Yefimovka is a rural locality (a selo) in Averyanovsky Selsoviet, Kizlyarsky District, Republic of Dagestan, Russia. The population was 597 as of 2010. There are 10 streets.

Geography 
Yefimovka is located 7 km southeast of Kizlyar (the district's administrative centre) by road. Kardonovka and Bolshezadoyevskoye are the nearest rural localities.

Nationalities 
Avars, Dargins, Russians and Laks live there.

References 

Rural localities in Kizlyarsky District